Gómez Farías Municipality is a municipality located in the Mexican state of Tamaulipas. The seat of government for the municipality is the town Gómez Farías. The town of Gómez Farías had a population of 883 in 2010. (231 sq. km.) of the municipal area is included in the El Cielo Biosphere Reserve.

In 1749, a settlement was established on the site of Gómez Farías to concentrate the semi-nomadic indigenous peoples of the area into a single community.  On 10 January 1869, the municipality was created and named after Valentín Gómez Farías, a former President of Mexico.

Climate
Most of the State of Tamaulipas is semi-arid and typically covered in a thorny scrub vegetation called Tamaulipan Mezquital.  Gómez Farías and a few other areas on the eastern slopes of the Sierra Madre Oriental are the exception, with high precipitation and luxuriant vegetation. El Cielo Biosphere Reserve is the most northerly area in Mexico of tropical Veracruz moist forests. Temperate Cloud forests are found at higher elevations.

Economy

Sugar cane, mostly grown with irrigation, is by far the most important agricultural product of the municipality.  Cattle, citrus, and mango are also important. In the mountainous part of the municipality, maize is the principal crop, grown mostly by small-scale farmers. Gómez Farías attracts a sizable number of tourists, including bird watchers and botanists, to the El Cielo Biosphere Reserve and scenic areas along the Sabinas and Frio rivers.

External links
http://www.gomezfarias.gob.mx/

References

Municipalities of Tamaulipas